Bekkara, also known as Bekkera, is a small village in Telangana, India. It is located in the Kalwakurthy mandal of Nagarkurnool district. It is administered by the Totapally grama panchayat.

Demographics 

Telugu is the local Language here. The total population of Bekkara is around 500 are living in 120 Houses. Total area of Bekkara is around 350 hectares.

References

Villages in Nagarkurnool district